Kostić is a Serbian surname that may refer to:

 Bora Kostić (1930-2011), Serbian footballer
 Boris Kostić (1887–1963), Serbian chess player
 Branko Kostić (born 1939), Montenegrin politician
 Darko Kostić (born 1980), Serbian fashion designer
 Duško Kostić, Roma student activist
 Filip Kostić (born 1992), Serbian footballer
 Goran Kostić (born 1971), Bosnian actor
 Laza Kostić (1841–1909), Serbian poet, prose writer, lawyer, philosopher, polyglot, publicist, and politician
 Lazo M. Kostić (1897-1979), Montenegrin Serb nationalist writer, economist, staticican and doctor in law
 Mika K. (Mirjana Kostić, born 1983), Serbian singer and musician
 Milivoje Kostic (born 1952), Serbian-American thermodynamicist, engineering professor emeritus
 Milos Kostic (born 1941), American triathlete
 Mina Kostić (born 1975), Bosnian-Serb singer
 Miodrag Kostić (born 1959), Serbian businessman
 Tanja Kostic (born 1972), Swedish basketball player
 Vladan Kostić (born 1977), Montenegrin footballer
 Vladimir S. Kostić (born 1953), Serbian doctor, neurologist and neuroscientist
 Voki Kostić (1931–2010), Serbian composer
 Vuk Kostić (born 1979), Serbian actor
 Zoran Kostić (born 1964), Serbian punk rock musician
 Zoran Kostić (born 1982), Serbian footballer

Serbian surnames
Slavic-language surnames
Patronymic surnames